The Kiiski-class minesweepers are a series of seven small minesweepers of the Finnish Navy. The ships were constructed in 1975 and were modernized in the 1990s.

Vessels of the class
Kiiski 1 (521)
Kiiski 2 (522)
Kiiski 3 (523)
Kiiski 4 (524)
Kiiski 5 (525)
Kiiski 6 (526)
Kiiski 7 (527)

References

Ships of the Finnish Navy
Minesweepers of the Finnish Navy